An earphone is a small headphone that fits in the outer ear.

Earphone(s) may also refer to:
Earphones (band), a fictitious idol group
Earphone Award, a list of awards bestowed by AudioFile 
Apple earphones, produced by Apple Inc.

See also
Headphones (disambiguation)